Utopia is the second of two self-titled albums by the rock group Utopia (the other being Todd Rundgren's Utopia).  It was released in 1982 (see 1982 in music).  It was also their only album for Network Records.

During the composing phase of this album, Kasim Sulton had left to pursue a solo career, and Doug Howard from the band Touch was brought in on bass. Howard co-wrote two songs on the album, "Feet Don’t Fail Me Now" and "I’m Looking at You But I’m Talking to Myself". These songs are credited to "Utopia and Doug Howard" on the finished album.  Howard stepped aside when Sulton decided to return, had no further involvement with the group, and was not featured in the album's cover photo.

Videos and singles were released for "Feet Don't Fail Me Now" and "Hammer in My Heart". Footage for "Hammer in My Heart" was recorded live on August 18, 1982, at MTV's official first-birthday celebration hosted by VeeJay Nina Blackwood. The song peaked at #31 on Billboard's Mainstream Rock chart. Both were featured on the VHS video release "The Utopia Sampler" nominated in 1983 for a Grammy for Best Short Form Video.

The original vinyl LP was released as a three-sided set of two 12" discs - the third side including five additional songs. It was then released as a single LP with the five additional songs on the included two-sided EP. Then as a single LP with an included five-song 45. The later CD releases simply include the five bonus tracks as part of the complete album (raising the song total from 11 to 15) with no mention of their origin on the bonus EP. In Europe, the EP was pressed as a 7" with the five songs split between the two sides; elsewhere, the EP was pressed as a 12" with all five songs repeated on both sides of the EP.

Track listing (Vinyl)
BMI credits all songs to Powell/Rundgren/Sulton/Wilcox except: 
"Feet Don’t Fail Me Now" and "I’m Looking at You But I’m Talking to Myself": Howard/Powell/Rundgren/Wilcox
"Libertine", "Bad Little Actress", "Princess of the Universe" and "Infrared and Ultraviolet": Powell/Rundgren/Wilcox

Side 1
"Libertine" (lead vocal: Sulton)
"Bad Little Actress" (lead vocal: Rundgren/Sulton)
"Feet Don’t Fail Me Now" (lead vocal on verses: Powell)
"Neck On Up" (lead vocal: Wilcox; bridge vocal Powell)
"Say Yeah" (lead vocals: Rundgren/Sulton)

Side 2
"Call It What You Will" (lead vocal: Sulton)
"I’m Looking at You But I’m Talking to Myself" (lead vocal: Rundgren)
"Hammer in My Heart" (lead vocal: Rundgren)
"Burn Three Times" (lead vocal: Powell)
"There Goes My Inspiration" (lead vocal: Rundgren/Sulton)

Side 3 (and later a Bonus EP (unlisted on album sleeve))
"Princess of the Universe" (lead vocal: Wilcox)
"Infrared and Ultraviolet" (lead vocals: Rundgren/Sulton)
"Forgotten But Not Gone" (lead vocals: Rundgren/Sulton)
"Private Heaven" (lead vocal: Sulton)
"Chapter and Verse" (lead vocal: Rundgren)

CD Track listing

"Libertine"
"Bad Little Actress"
"Feet Don’t Fail Me Now"
"Neck On Up"
"Say Yeah"
"Call It What You Will"
"I’m Looking at You But I’m Talking to Myself"
"Hammer In My Heart"
"Burn Three Times"
"There Goes My Inspiration"
"Princess of the Universe"
"Infrared and Ultraviolet"
"Forgotten But Not Gone"
"Private Heaven"
"Chapter and Verse"
"Hammer In My Heart (Dance Mix) (only available on 2000 CD reissue by Unidisc Music)

Personnel
 Todd Rundgren - guitar and vocals
 Roger Powell - keyboards and vocals
 Kasim Sulton - bass and vocals
 John "Willie" Wilcox - drums, percussion and vocals
 Doug Howard - bass and vocals

Charts
Album - Billboard

References

1982 albums
Todd Rundgren albums
Albums produced by Todd Rundgren
Utopia (band) albums
Epic Records albums
Rhino Records albums